Sebastián Anibal Váldez (born 6 November 1995) is an Argentine professional footballer who plays as a centre-back for Club Almagro.

Career
Valdez began with Los Andes. Marcelo Barrera was the manager who selected Valdez for his senior debut, picking him to start a 3–3 draw with Villa Dálmine on 2 June 2016. Thirty further appearances subsequently arrived for the Primera B Nacional club across his next two seasons.

Career statistics
.

References

External links

1995 births
Living people
Footballers from Buenos Aires
Argentine footballers
Association football defenders
Primera Nacional players
Club Atlético Los Andes footballers
Club Almagro players